Orthodena is a genus of trematodes in the family Opecoelidae. It consists of one species, Orthodena tropica Durio & Manter, 1968.

References

Opecoelidae
Plagiorchiida genera
Monotypic platyhelminthes genera